Naguib Verjee (date of birth unknown) is a Kenyan former first-class cricketer.

Verjee represented Kenya in two editions of the ICC Trophy in 1982 and 1986, making eleven appearances. He also made one appearance in first-class cricket for Kenya against the touring Pakistan Starlets at Nairobi in 1986. Batting twice, he was dismissed in the Kenyan first innings for 22 runs by Sajjad Akbar, while in their second innings he was dismissed for 16 runs by Nadeem Ghauri.

References

External links

Living people
Kenyan cricketers
Year of birth missing (living people)